Chris Byrd vs. Wladimir Klitschko, billed as Die Rache des Bruders (German for "Revenge Of The Brother"), was a professional boxing match contested on 14 October 2000 for the WBO Heavyweight Championship.

Background
After his shock victory over the undefeated Vitali Klitschko, following Vitali suffering a torn rotator cuff, Chris Byrd agreed to face his number one contender, and Vitali's younger brother Wladimir. Wladimir Klitschko had won ten fights in a row following his first pro loss at the hands of journeyman Ross Puritty in December 1998.

The fight
Klitschko knocked Byrd down in round nine and again in round eleven on route to a clear unanimous decision victory with scores of 120-106, 119-107 & 118-108, giving him his first world title belt.

Aftermath
Wladimir would go on to make six defences of his title before he suffered a knockout loss to Corrie Sanders in March 2003. Byrd would win his next four bouts, including against Maurice Harris and David Tua in an IBF heavyweight title "eliminator" mini-tournament which put him in line for a shot at the IBF belt then held by Lennox Lewis. Lewis would vacate the title and Byrd would face former champion Evander Holyfield for the vacant belt.

Undercard
Confirmed bouts:

Broadcasting

References

2000 in boxing
Boxing in Germany
2000 in German sport
Klitschko brothers
October 2000 sports events in Europe
World Boxing Organization heavyweight championship matches
Boxing matches